Angela McGregor is a former New Zealand rugby sevens player. She represented New Zealand at the 2009 Rugby World Cup Sevens in Dubai.

McGregor was named in the Black Ferns sevens Development Squad for the 2001 International Women's Sevens Tournament at Upper Hutt.

In 2008, she was selected in a squad of 29 players for a three-day trial camp. It was to select the final squad for a qualifying tournament in Samoa.

References 

Living people
New Zealand female rugby union players
New Zealand female rugby sevens players
New Zealand women's international rugby sevens players
Year of birth missing (living people)